Eddie Chambers (born 1960) is a British contemporary art historian, curator, artist and Department of Art and Art History professor at the University of Texas at Austin.

Artistic career
Chambers was born in Wolverhampton, England, to parents who were immigrants from Jamaica. While still a student at Sunderland Polytechnic, where he was studying for a Fine Art degree, Chambers met Trent Polytechnic student Keith Piper. Alongside Marlene Smith and Donald Rodney, they formed the BLK Art Group, a groundbreaking association of Black British art students. The group's highly politicised work, including Chambers' Destruction of the National Front, attracted press attention and critical interest.

Most recently, his work has featured in the exhibition No Colour Bar: Black British Art in Action 1960–1990, at the Guildhall Art Gallery (10 July 2015 – 24 January 2016), as part of which he was in conversation with Errol Lloyd on 13 July 2015, discussing "the impact made by notable Black Artists in the late 20th Century, who have gone largely unnoticed in the British Art Arena".

Curating
After leaving the BLK Art Group in the 1980s, Chambers continued to champion the work of other artists, curating exhibitions throughout the UK and internationally, including Black People and the British Flag, Eugene Palmer, Frank Bowling: Bowling on through the Century and Tam Joseph: This is History. In 1998 he was awarded a PhD in History of Art from Goldsmiths College, University of London, for his thesis "Black Visual Arts Activity in England Between 1981–1986: Press and Public Responses". Concerned about the need to document the practice of black artists, in 1989, Chambers set up the African and Asian Visual Artists' Archive (AAVAA), which was the first research and reference facility in the country for documenting British-based Black visual artists. Drawing on material in his own collection relating to the visual arts practices of artists particularly from African, South Asian and other diasporas, he also initiated the online research and reference facility Diaspora Artists.

Writing
In the 21st century, Chambers moved into the world of academia and art writing - contributing catalogue essays, anthology entries, articles and books with a focus on the work and history of black British and African diaspora artists. Moving to the United States, in 2010 he became an assistant professor of art history at the University of Texas, Austin, and also wrote his first substantial work of contemporary art history, Things Done Change: The Cultural Politics of Recent Black Artists in Britain (2012), which garnered enthusiastic responses in leading journals, including Art Review, which described his writing as "excellent" and "nuanced". In 2014, Dr Chambers published an expanded consideration of his themes in Black Artists in British Art: A History from 1950 to the Present.

Selected bibliography

Books

 The Routledge Companion to African American Art History. Routledge. 2019.  
Roots & Culture: Cultural Politics in the making of Black Britain. Bloomsbury, 2017.  

 "Black Visual Arts Activity in the 1980s", in The History of British Art: 1870 – Now, Tate Publishing, 2008. ; 
  Entry on Art and Artists, British-Caribbean, in Britain and the Americas: Culture, Politics, and History, California: ABC-CLIO, 2005. ; 
 "The Art of Donald Rodney" in the monograph Donald Rodney: Doublethink, London: Autograph, 2003. ; 
 Entries on Frank Bowling, Lubaina Himid and Tam Joseph in Guide to Black Artists, 1997, St James Press, in association with the Schomburg Center for Research in Black Culture.

Articles
 Subject: Artists' work about riots. 
Chambers, Eddie (March 1998). "Brits in the Bronx". Art Monthly. 214. Available at: https://www.artmonthly.co.uk/magazine/site/article/brits-in-the-bronx-by-eddie-chambers-march-1998

References 

1960 births
English people of Jamaican descent
British curators
English curators
Black British writers
Black British artists
Alumni of Goldsmiths, University of London
Alumni of the University of Sunderland
People from Wolverhampton
Living people
University of Texas at Austin faculty
20th-century British artists
21st-century British artists
21st-century British male writers
21st-century male artists